Richard Anconina (born 28 January 1953) is a French actor.  He won the César Award for Best Supporting Actor in 1983, and for Best Actor in 1989.

Filmography
1977 : Comment se faire réformer directed by Philippe Clair
1978 : Les Réformés se portent bien  directed by Philippe Clair
1979 : Démons de midi directed by Christian Paureilhe
1980 : Le Bar du téléphone  directed by Claude Barrois – Boum-Boum
1980 : À vingt minutes par le R.E.R.
1980 : Inspecteur la Bavure directed by Claude Zidi – Philou
1981 : L'Arme au bleu 
1981 : Asphalte directed by Denis Amar – un pilleur 
1981 : La Provinciale directed by Claude Goretta
1981 : Le Petit Pommier directed by Liliane de Kermadec
1981 : Une robe noire pour un tueur  directed by José Giovanni –  un jeune drogué
1981 : Le Choix des armes directed by Alain Corneau – Dany
1982 : Emmenez-moi au théâtre : L'étrangleur s'excite
1983 : Le Battant directed by Alain Delon – Samatan
1983 : Cap Canaille  directed by Juliet Berto – Mayolles
1983 : Le Jeune Marié  directed by Bernard Stora – Baptiste
1983 : Une pierre dans la bouche directed by Jean-Louis Leconte – Marc
1983 : Tchao Pantin  directed by Claude Berri – Bensoussan
1984 : L'Intrus directed by Irène Jouannet – Gilles
1984 : Paroles et Musique directed by Elie Chouraqui – Michel
1985 : Partir, revenir directed by Claude Lelouch – Vincent Rivière
1985 : Police  directed by Maurice Pialat – Lambert
1986 :   directed by Robert Enrico – Jeff Montelier
1986 :  directed by Alain Corneau – Willie
1987 :  directed by Gérard Oury – Moïse Levy
1988 : What if Gargiulo Finds Out? directed by Elvio Porta – Ferdinando
1988 : Envoyez les violons directed by Roger Andrieux – Frédéric Segal
1988 : Itinéraire d'un enfant gâté  directed by Claude Lelouch – Albert Duvivier
1990 : Miss Missouri directed by Elie Chouraqui – Nathan Leven
1990 : Le Petit Criminel directed by Jacques Doillon – le flic
1991 : A quoi tu penses-tu? directed by Didier Kaminka – Pierre
1992 : La Place du père
1994 : Fall from Grace (TV)
1994 : Coma (TV) – Julien
1996 : Hercule et Sherlock  directed by Jeannot Szwarc – Bruno
1997 : La Vérité si je mens!  directed by Thomas Gilou – Eddie Vuibert
1997 : Les Héritiers
2000 : Six-Pack  directed by Alain Berbérian – Nathan
2001 : La Vérité si je mens!  2 directed by Thomas Gilou – Eddie Vuibert
2002 : Gangsters directed by Olivier Marchal – Franck Chaïevski
2004 : Alive directed by Frédéric Berthe – Alex Meyer
2007 : Dans les cordes directed by Magaly Richard-Serrano – Joseph
2010 : Camping 2 directed by Fabien Onteniente – Jean-Pierre Savelli
2012 : La vérité si je mens! 3 directed by Thomas Gilou – Eddie Vuibert
2012 : Stars des années 80 directed by Frédéric Forestier – Vincent
2016 : The law of Christophe, TV Movie directed by Jacques Malaterre – Christophe Vitari

References

External links

1953 births
Living people
Male actors from Paris
French male film actors
20th-century French Jews
French people of Moroccan-Jewish descent
Most Promising Actor César Award winners
Best Supporting Actor César Award winners
20th-century French male actors
21st-century French male actors
Commandeurs of the Ordre des Arts et des Lettres